Tandrano is a town and commune in Madagascar. It belongs to the district of Ankazoabo, which is a part of Atsimo-Andrefana Region. The population was 9,000 in 2001 commune census.

Only primary schooling is available. The majority 52% of the population of the commune are farmers. 45% raise livestock. The most important crop is rice, while other important products are maize and cassava.  Services provide employment for 1% of the population. Fishing employs 2% of the population.

References and notes 

Populated places in Atsimo-Andrefana